Plantation is a neighborhood in southwestern Lexington, Kentucky, United States. It is bounded by Man O War Boulevard, Harrodsburg Road, and Old Higbee Mill Road.

Neighborhood statistics
 Area: 
 Population: 1,322
 Population density: 3,466 people per square mile
 Median household income: $85,047

External links
 http://www.city-data.com/neighborhood/Plantation-Lexington-KY.html

Neighborhoods in Lexington, Kentucky